Welcome is an unincorporated community in Charles County, Maryland, United States. The designated zip code is 20693.

It is located seven miles from La Plata on Rt 6 West. The Goose Bay campground and marina are also located in Welcome.  Rosemary Lawn, a plantation owned since the 18th century by the Barnes-Compton family, was listed on the National Register of Historic Places in 1992.

Notable person

Barnes Compton, 19th-century Congressman and state senator, who resided at Rosemary Lawn, a plantation inherited from his mother, Mary Key (Barnes) Compton.

References

Unincorporated communities in Maryland
Unincorporated communities in Charles County, Maryland